The 2007–08 season was Villarreal Club de Fútbol's 85th season in existence and the club's 8th consecutive season in the top flight of Spanish football. In addition to the domestic league, Villarreal participated in this season's editions of the Copa del Rey and the UEFA Cup. The season covered the period from 1 July 2007 to 30 June 2008.

Season summary

Villarreal enjoyed the best season in their history, finishing as runners-up.

Players

First-team squad
Squad at end of season

Left club during season

Competitions

Overall record

La Liga

League table

Results summary

Results by round

Matches

Copa del Rey

Round of 32

Round of 16

Quarter-finals

UEFA Cup

First round

Group stage

Knockout phase

Round of 32

Notes and references

Notes

References

Villarreal CF seasons
Villarreal